The Burden of Proof (also Scott Turow's The Burden of Proof) is a 1992 television miniseries based on the 1990 novel of the same name by Scott Turow. The story follows the character Sandy Stern following events in the film and book Presumed Innocent. Brian Dennehy is the only actor to appear in both films, but here plays a different character.

The miniseries was directed by Mike Robe, adapted by John Gay, and premiered on February 9, 1992. The film was an original production filmed and aired by the ABC Video Enterprises, and was also released theatrically outside the US. by Warner Bros. Pictures.

Plot
A lawyer who's still recuperating after the untimely death of his wife, must defend his probably dirty brother-in-law, a stockbroker under investigation. He discovers that everyone has dark secrets, including himself.

Cast

 Héctor Elizondo as Alejandro "Sandy" Stern
 Brian Dennehy as Dixon Hartnell
 Mel Harris as Sonia Klonsky
 Adrienne Barbeau as Silvia Hartnell
 Concetta Tomei as Clara Stern
 Anne Bobby as Marta Stern (as Anne Marie Bobby)
 Gail Strickland as Fiona Cawley
 Chelcie Ross as Dr. Nate Cawley
 Kerri Green as Kate Granum
 Miko Hughes as Sam
 Thomas Anthony Quinn as Dr. Peter Stern
 Jeffrey Tambor as Sennett
 Nora Denney as Waitress
 John Durbin as Remo
 T. Max Graham as Lt. Ray Radczyk
 William Kuhlke as Cal Hopkinson
 Leah Maddrie as Mrs. Drake
 Monica McCarthy as Nate's Nurse
 Neal McDonough as John Granum
 Michael T. McGraw as FBI Agent #1
 Charles Oldfather
 Stefanie Powers as Helen Dudak
 Victoria Principal as Margy Allison
 Grady Smith
 Tim Snay as FBI Agent #2
 Donna Thomason as Claudia
 Charles Whitman as Rabbi

Reception
 The miniseries won an Eddie Award for Best Editing.
 Brian Dennehy was nominated for the Primetime Emmy Award for Outstanding Supporting Actor in a Limited Series or Movie.
 The miniseries was nominated for the Primetime Emmy Award for Outstanding Limited Series.

Release
The miniseries was a production by Mike Robe Productions, Capital Cities and ABC Video Enterprises, it's aired in the ABC on February 9, 1992. ABC handled U.S. distribution, while Warner Bros. handled International distribution. Warner Bros. handles the rights of the miniseries to be released on theatrical versions and on home video (including Warner Home Video). As of 1996, The Walt Disney Company now owns domestic rights to The Burden of Proof through ABC, which had obtained the miniseries rights domestically.

Home media
The duo-series has been released on VHS and DVD as a single movie, albeit a 184-minute release.

References

External links
 

Kindle County
1990s American television miniseries
Television shows based on American novels
Works by Scott Turow
Films with screenplays by John Gay (screenwriter)
1992 television films
1992 films
1992 drama films
ABC Motion Pictures films
Warner Bros. films
Films directed by Mike Robe